Claudio Fabián Otermín (born March 18, 1961 in Buenos Aires, Argentina) is a former Argentine footballer who played for clubs of Argentina, Chile, Spain and France. He played as a centre forward.

Teams
  Sarmiento de Junín 1981–1982
  Mallorca 1982–1983
  Nueva Chicago 1983
  O'Higgins 1984
  San Marcos de Arica 1984
  Gimnasia y Esgrima de La Plata 1985–1986
  Istres 1986–1987
  Angoulême 1987–1990

References
 

1961 births
Living people
Argentine footballers
Argentine expatriate footballers
Club de Gimnasia y Esgrima La Plata footballers
Club Atlético Sarmiento footballers
Nueva Chicago footballers
San Marcos de Arica footballers
O'Higgins F.C. footballers
Chilean Primera División players
Argentine Primera División players
Expatriate footballers in Chile
Expatriate footballers in Spain
Expatriate footballers in France
Association football forwards
Footballers from Buenos Aires
C.D. Olmedo managers